Sadeqabad (also Romanized as Şādeqābād) is a village in Zalian Rural District, Zalian District, Shazand County, Markazi Province, Iran. At the 2006 census, its population was 187, in 56 families.

References 

Populated places in Shazand County